Xetra (Market Identifier Code: XETR) is a trading venue operated by the Frankfurt Stock Exchange based in Frankfurt, Germany.

In 2015, 90 percent of all trading in shares at all German exchanges was transacted through the Xetra trading venue. With regard to DAX listings, Xetra has 60 per cent market share throughout Europe. Trading times on trading days are from 9.00 a.m. to 5.30 p.m. The prices on Xetra serve as the basis for calculating the DAX, the best-known German share index.

Over 200 trading participants from 16 European countries, plus Hong Kong and the United Arab Emirates, are connected via Xetra servers in Frankfurt am Main.

Given the high turnover (market liquidity) on the Xetra trading venue, orders for securities are executed swiftly and at prices in line with the market. Moreover, this principle is supported by Designated Sponsors who post binding purchase and selling prices (quotes) on a continuous basis and thus ensure additional liquidity and fair prices.

As all the exchange trading is transacted electronically, there can be partial execution of orders on the Xetra trading venue. However, banks and online brokers do not face additional transaction costs for same-day partial executions and therefore most of them do not bill their clients additionally for partial executions.

All listings are in euro including shares of secondary listings from issuers whose primary listing is in an other currency than the euro.

Protective mechanisms and market surveillance 
With a view to improving the continuity of prices and to avoid mistrades (clearly erroneous trades), several protective mechanisms are in place for the Xetra trading venue. These include volatility interruption, market order interruption, and liquidity interruption measures. Trading on the Xetra trading venue is governed by clear rules, which apply equally for all trading participants. Independent market surveillance is made up of the Trading Surveillance Office (HÜSt), the Exchange Supervisory Authority attached to the Hessian Ministry of Economic Affairs, Transportation, and Regional Development, and the Federal Financial Supervisory Authority (BaFin).

Admission of securities 
The admission of securities to the Frankfurt Stock Exchange and its trading venues Xetra and Börse Frankfurt does not require separate admission. Newly listed securities at the Xetra trading venue are automatically included in Börse Frankfurt trading.

The organising companies of the Frankfurt Stock Exchange are Deutsche Börse AG and Börse Frankfurt Zertifikate AG.

Xetra is a registered trademark of Deutsche Börse AG.

Development 
The Xetra trading technology was positioned as a brand product while it was still being developed. The intention was to be able to better position Xetra among trading participants and in the public eye, and to license it to other exchange operators. The trading technology of Xetra was designed and implemented on the basis of Eurex trading technology; this was undertaken on behalf of Deutsche Börse AG by Andersen Consulting (nowadays Accenture) and Deutsche Börse Systems.

Co-operation partners 
Through its Deutsche Börse Cash Market business section, Deutsche Börse AG in Frankfurt/Main now operates two trading venues based on the trading technology of Xetra:
 Xetra (XETR) is the reference market for German equities and exchange traded funds. Active exchange traded funds, exchange traded commodities and exchange traded notes can also be traded.
 Börse Frankfurt (XFRA), with the Börse Frankfurt Zertifikate AG (formerly Scoach) derivatives exchange, which migrated on 28 April 2008. The Börse Frankfurt trading venue was migrated to the trading technology of Xetra on 20 May 2011.
Furthermore, the trading technology of  Xetra has also been in use at the Vienna Stock Exchange since November 1999. In December 2010, the Vienna Stock Exchange similarly introduced Xetra at the Ljubljana Stock Exchange. The trading technology is also in operation at the Prague Stock Exchange (since November 2012), the Budapest Stock Exchange (since December 2013), the Irish Stock Exchange (since 2000), the Bulgarian Stock Exchange (since 2008), the Malta Stock Exchange (since 2012), the Cayman Islands Stock Exchange (since 2013) and the Zagreb Stock Exchange (since 2017). Eurex Bonds, the Deutsche Börse trading platform for government bonds, relies on the trading technology of Xetra. The New Generation Trading System in operation at the Shanghai Stock Exchange was also developed on the basis of the trading technology of Xetra.

History 
The trading technology of Xetra replaced the IBIS trading platform on 28 November 1997. Advocates cited execution prices in line with the market, low transaction costs, equality, geographical location, and the anonymity of trading partners in its favour. The main challenges discerned were to ensure system stability and availability, scalability, latency, and long-term growth in market activity.

References

External links
Xetra website
Deutsche Börse Cash Market - Xetra trading venue

1997 establishments in Germany
Products introduced in 1997
Financial services companies of Germany
Economy of Frankfurt
Electronic trading platforms